Mårten Boström (born 3 August 1982 in Kirkkonummi) is a Finnish orienteering competitor and long-distance runner. He won a gold medal in sprint at the 2013 World Orienteering Championships in Vuokatti. He reached the podium in the junior race at the Nordic Cross Country Championships in 2001, taking the bronze. He received a bronze medal in sprint at the 2004 European Orienteering Championships in Roskilde. He received a silver medal in the classic distance at the 2001 Junior World Orienteering Championships, and a bronze medal in the relay event in 2000.

See also
 Finnish orienteers
 List of orienteers
 List of orienteering events

References

External links

1982 births
Living people
People from Kirkkonummi
Finnish orienteers
Male orienteers
Foot orienteers
World Orienteering Championships medalists
Finnish male long-distance runners
Sportspeople from Uusimaa
Junior World Orienteering Championships medalists